Leiocassis is a genus of bagrid catfishes found mostly in Southeast Asia with some species occurring in China.

This genus has a confused taxonomy and there is uncertainty surrounding the number of valid species. Certain East Asian bagrids formerly placed in this genus have been moved to Pseudobagrus. In 2006, Heok Hee Ng considered the genus Leiocassis to be restricted to Sundaic Southeast Asia and Borneo and only a handful of species as valid (L. aculeatus, L. collinus, L. hosii, L. micropogon, L. poecilopterus, and L. tenebricus).

The members of Leiocassis have an elongate narrow head and a prominently protruding snout.

Species 
There are currently 14 recognized species in this genus:
 Leiocassis aculeatus H. H. Ng & Hadiaty, 2005
 Leiocassis bekantan H. H. Ng & H. H. Tan, 2018
 Leiocassis brevirostris V. H. Nguyễn, 2005
 Leiocassis collinus H. H. Ng & K. K. P. Lim, 2006
 Leiocassis crassirostris Regan, 1913
 Leiocassis doriae Regan, 1913
 Leiocassis hosii Regan, 1906
 Leiocassis longibarbus G. H. Cui, 1990
 Leiocassis micropogon (Bleeker, 1852)
 Leiocassis nitidus (Sauvage & Dabryi, 1874)
 Leiocassis poecilopterus (Valenciennes, 1840)
 Leiocassis saravacensis Boulenger, 1894
 Leiocassis tenebricus H. H. Ng & K. K. P. Lim, 2006
 Leiocassis yeni V. H. Nguyễn & H. D. Nguyễn, 2005

References

Bagridae
Fish of Asia
Catfish genera
Freshwater fish genera
Taxa named by Pieter Bleeker